The Detroit Fury were an arena football team based in Auburn Hills, Michigan.

History
The team was a member of the Arena Football League from 2001 to 2004 and played at The Palace of Auburn Hills, also the home of the NBA's Detroit Pistons. A name the team contest was held in 2000 to generate public interest. With over 3000 submissions  . The name submitted by teenager Todd Nye was selected as the winner.
The team was co-owned by William Davidson, who owned the Pistons, along with William Clay Ford, Jr., son of the owner of the National Football League Detroit Lions. On September 20, 2004, the AFL announced the termination of this franchise, and that its players would be made available to the remaining teams in a dispersal draft. The Fury made the playoffs in their first season and again in 2003.

Season-by-season

|-
|2001 || 7 || 7 || 0 || || Lost Wild Card Round (Arizona) 52–44
|-
|2002 || 1 || 13 || 0 || || 
|-
|2003 || 8 || 8 || 0 || || Won Wild Card Round (Grand Rapids) 55–54 Lost Quarterfinals (Tampa Bay) 52–48
|-
|2004 || 5 || 11 || 0 || ||
|-
!Totals || 22 || 41 || 0
|colspan="2"| (including playoffs)
|}

Notable players

Individual awards

All-Arena players
The following Fury players were named to All-Arena Teams:
OL/DL R-Kal Truluck (2)

All-Rookie players
The following Fury players were named to All-Rookie Teams:
OL/DL R-Kal Truluck

References

External links
 Detroit Fury at ArenaFan.com

 
American football teams in Michigan
2001 establishments in Michigan